Marcelo Antonio Pereira Rodríguez (born 27 May 1995) is a Honduran professional footballer who plays as a defender for Motagua and the Honduras national team.

Club career
In 2013, Pereira joined F.C. Motagua from C.D. Olimpia. He was assigned to their reserves and made his senior debut with the first team during the 2014–15 season.

International career
Pereira got his first call up to the senior Honduras side for a friendly against Belize in October 2016.

References

External links
 

Honduran footballers
Honduras international footballers
1995 births
Living people
Footballers at the 2016 Summer Olympics
Olympic footballers of Honduras
F.C. Motagua players
Sportspeople from Tegucigalpa
Association football defenders
2017 Copa Centroamericana players
2017 CONCACAF Gold Cup players
2021 CONCACAF Gold Cup players
Copa Centroamericana-winning players